Paul Kooistra was the past President of Covenant Theological Seminary, Erskine College and Erskine Theological Seminary in Due West, South Carolina.

Kooistra was born in Duluth, Minnesota, and received an M.Div. from Columbia Theological Seminary in Decatur, Georgia and a Ph.D. from the University of Alabama.

Kooistra is a Presbyterian minister and the past coordinator of Mission to the World, the missions agency of the Presbyterian Church in America (PCA). He was elected moderator of the 2008-2009 General Assembly of the PCA.

He served as a pastor and professor at Belhaven College and Reformed Theological Seminary in Jackson, Mississippi, and president of Covenant Theological Seminary (the official seminary of the PCA).

Kooistra has written devotional booklets Thirty-One Days of Grace, Supper's Ready and Pursuit of Joy.

On July 18, 2014, he was elected president of both Erskine College and Erskine Theological Seminary, which are affiliated with the Associate Reformed Presbyterian Church. He resigned in 2016.

References

Presbyterian Church in America ministers
People from Duluth, Minnesota
Living people
Presidents of Calvinist and Reformed seminaries
Erskine College
Heads of universities and colleges in the United States
Covenant Theological Seminary faculty
Columbia Theological Seminary alumni
University of Alabama alumni
Year of birth missing (living people)